John Fleetwood (died 1590), of Colwich, Staffordshire and Penwortham, Lancashire, was the Member of Parliament for Staffordshire in 1572.

References

Year of birth missing
1590 deaths
People from Cannock Chase District
People from Penwortham
English MPs 1572–1583